The Nābhi-nandana-jinoddhāra-prabandha is a 1336 Sanskrit book in the prabandha genre written by the Jain scholar Kakka Suri (Kakkasūri). The main objective of the book is to record the renovation of the Rishabhanatha Jain temple in Shatrunjaya, Gujarat, during the Delhi Sultanate rule. The work also provides other information, such as a history of the author's spiritual lineage (gaccha) and a description of the Delhi Sultan Alauddin Khalji's military conquests.

Background 

During Alauddin Khalji's conquest of Gujarat, some Jain temples in Gujarat had been desecrated. In 1315, Alauddin's governor Alp Khan allowed restoration of these temples. Samara Shaha, a wealthy merchant from Patan, led a large pilgrimage to Shatrunjaya, and carried out a renovation of the temples in a grand ceremony. His guide was Siddhasuri, an acharya of the Upakesha-gaccha.

This was the fifteenth renovation of the Shatrunjaya temples. During the seventh renovation, an image from the sixth renovation had been hidden in a cave. Siddhasuri found this image of the Jain tirthankara Adinatha, and Samara had it reconsecrated during the fifteenth renovation.

Kakka Suri, a disciple of Siddhasuri, composed Nabhi-nandana-jinoddhara-prabandha to narrate the story of this fifteenth renovation, as well as the previous renovations. The title of the work means "Narrative of the Renovation of the Temple of the Jina Who is the Joy of Nabhi". In addition, the book provides a history of the author's spiritual lineage.

The text was completed in 1336 CE (1393 VS). It contains 2344 verses, which provide information about the social, economic, religious and political history of the period.

Description of Alauddin's achievements 

Notably, the book also contains 9 verses describing the military conquests of the Delhi Sultan Alauddin Khalji, a Muslim whose forces had destroyed the temples. Kakka Suri does not list the motives of Muslims in destroying the temples, and suggests that such misfortunes are to be expected in the sinful Kali Yuga. He instead focuses on demonstrating the Jain community's prosperity by describing the lavish renovations.

Kakka Suri describes the military conquests of Alauddin as follows:

References

Bibliography 

 
 
 

Jain texts
Sanskrit literature
1330s books